A Zindler curve is a simple closed plane curve with the defining property that:

(L) All chords, which cut the curve length into halves, have the same length.

The most simple examples are circles. The Austrian mathematician Konrad Zindler discovered further examples, and gave a method to construct them. Herman Auerbach was the first, who used (in 1938) the now established name Zindler curve. 

Auerbach proved that a figure bounded by a Zindler curve and with half the density of water will float in water in any position. This gives a negative answer to the bidimensional version of Stanislaw Ulam's problem on floating bodies (Problem 19 of the Scottish Book), which asks if the disk is the only figure of uniform density which will float in water in any position (the original problem asks if the sphere is the only solid having this property in three dimension). 

Zindler curves are also connected to the problem of establishing if it is possible to determine the direction of the motion of a bicycle given only the closed rear and front tracks.

Equivalent definitions 
An equivalent definition of a Zindler curve is the following one:
(A) All chords, which cut the area into halves, have the same length. 

These chords are the same, which cut the curve length into halves.

Another definition is based on Zindler carousels of two chairs. Consider two smooth curves in R²  given by λ1 and λ2. Suppose that the distance between points λ1(t) and λ2(t) are constant for each t ∈ R and that the curve defined by the midpoints between  λ1 and λ2 is such that its tangent vector at the point t  is parallel to the segment from λ1(t)  to λ2(t) for each t.  If the curves λ1 and λ2 parametrizes the same smooth closed curve, then this curve is a Zindler curve.

Examples 
Consider a fixed real parameter . For , any of the curves

is a Zindler curve. For  the curve is even convex. For  the curves are related to a curve of constant width.

Proof of (L): The derivative of the parametric equation is

 and 

 is -periodic.
Hence for any  the following equation holds

 

which is half the length of the entire curve.
The desired chords, which divide the curve into halves are bounded by the points  for any .

For  the desired chords meet the curve in an additional point (see Figure 3). Hence only for  the sample curves are Zindler curves.

Generalizations 
The property defining Zindler curves can also be generalized to chords that cut the perimeter of the curve in a fixed ratio α different from 1/2. In this case, one may consider a chord system (a continuous selection of chords) instead of all chords of the curve. These curves are known as α-Zindler curves, and are Zindler curves for α = 1/2. This generalization of Zindler curve has the following property related to the floating problem: let γ be a closed smooth curve with a chord system cutting the perimeter in a fixed ratio α. If all the chords of this chord system are in the interior of the region bounded by γ, then γ is a α-Zindler curve if and only if the region bounded by γ is a solid of uniform density ρ that floats in any orientation.

See also 
 Curve of constant width
 Reuleaux polygon

Notes

References 
 Herman Auerbach: Sur un problème de M. Ulam concernant l’équilibre des corps flottants (PDF; 796 kB), Studia Mathematica 7 (1938), 121–142.
 K. L. Mampel: Über Zindlerkurven, Journal für reine und angewandte Mathematik 234 (1969), 12–44.
 Konrad Zindler: Über konvexe Gebilde. II. Teil, Monatshefte für Mathematik und Physik 31 (1921), 25–56.
 H. Martini, S. Wu: On Zindler Curves in Normed Planes, Canadian Mathematical Bulletin 55 (2012), 767–773.
 J. Bracho, L. Montejano, D. Oliveros: Carousels, Zindler curves and the floating body problem, Periodica Mathematica Hungarica 49 (2004), 9–23.
 P. M. Gruber, J.M. Wills: Convexity and Its Applications, Springer, 1983, p. 58.

External links 

 http://www.thphys.uni-heidelberg.de/~wegner/Fl2mvs/Movies.html - A page by Franz Wegner illustrating some bodies that float in any direction.
 https://www.rose-hulman.edu/~finn/research/bicycle/tracks.html - A page by David L. Finn illustrating some pair of curves which is not possible to determine which one is the rear or the front track of a bicycle. 

Plane curves